Emma Louise Lamb (born 16 December 1997) is an English cricketer who plays for Lancashire Women, North West Thunder and Manchester Originals, and has previously played for Lancashire Thunder. Lamb is a batting all-rounder, and bowls off spin. She made her international debut for the England women's cricket team in September 2021.

Personal life
Lamb is from Preston, Lancashire, England. She studied at Edge Hill University, graduating in 2019. Her brother Danny plays for the Lancashire men's team, and she played alongside him when she became the first female cricketer to take part in the Cheshire County Premier League.

Club career
Lamb played at youth level for Lancashire Women, and was their player of the year on two occasions. She averaged over 100 in under-17 level cricket. In 2015, Lamb became the first woman to play in the Cheshire County Cricket League, when she played for Bramhall against Neston. She scored 30 runs in the match. Her brother Danny also played in the match. Lamb has also played for the Lancashire men's academy. she was the second woman to have done so (the first being Kate Cross).

Lamb made her Women's County Championship debut in 2012, playing for Lancashire Women against Warwickshire Women. In 2013, she made her first century in a match against Durham Women. Aged 18, Lamb opened the batting for Lancashire Thunder in the 2016 Women's Cricket Super League. She made the most runs of any English woman in the tournament, and was the only English woman in the top 10 run scorers. Lamb was part of the Lancashire Women team that won two trophies: the 2017 Women's County Championship, and the 2017 Women's Twenty20 Cup. In 2018, Lamb took 4/17 in a Super League match against Southern Vipers. It was the best bowling figures by a Thunder bowler in the Super League. Between 2016 and 2019, Lamb made 30 appearances for Thunder in the Super League, scoring 329 runs and taking 21 wickets. In 2020, Lamb played for North West Thunder in the Rachael Heyhoe Flint Trophy. In December 2020, Lamb was one of 41 women's cricketers given a full-time domestic cricket contract. Lamb was selected to play for Manchester Originals in The Hundred; the 2020 season was cancelled due to the COVID-19 pandemic, and Lamb was retained by the Originals for the 2021 season. She was the second leading run scorer of Manchester Originals with 135 runs in the tournament. 

In 2021, Lamb became the first batter to score a century in the Charlotte Edwards Cup, scoring 111* off 61 balls against Sunrisers. She ended the tournament as the second highest run-scorer across all teams. She was also North West Thunder's leading run-scorer in the Rachael Heyhoe Flint Trophy, with 237 runs including her List A high score of 121.

In April 2022, she was bought by the Manchester Originals for the 2022 season of The Hundred.

International career
In 2016, Lamb was called up to the England women's cricket team for their tour of Sri Lanka. She played for the England women's academy in matches against Sri Lanka A and Australia Shooting Stars. In 2017, Lamb played for England in a pre-season tour match against Ireland. The match was a warm up match prior to the 2017 Women's Cricket World Cup.

In February 2020, Lamb attended a Professional Cricketers' Association rookie training camp. In April 2020, Lamb was awarded an England rookie contract. In June 2020, Lamb was one of 25 women given a retainer contract. The retainer was in addition to her rookie contract. In the same month, she was one of 24 England women given permission to start training ahead of possible international matches. It was the first time that woman cricketers had been allowed to train since English cricket was suspended due to the COVID-19 pandemic. Lamb was one of three uncapped players in the training squad; the others were Lauren Bell and Issy Wong.

In August 2021, Lamb was added to England's Women's Twenty20 International (WT20I) squad for their series against New Zealand, after Maia Bouchier and Charlie Dean were both ruled out of the first match after being identified as possible COVID-19 contacts. She made her WT20I England debut in the first match of the series.

In December 2021, Lamb was named in England's A squad for their tour to Australia, with the matches being played alongside the Women's Ashes. Lamb was added to England's Ashes squad for the final Women's One Day International (WODI) match of the tour, where she made her WODI debut. In February 2022, she was named in England's team for the 2022 Women's Cricket World Cup in New Zealand. In June 2022, Lamb was named in England's Women's Test squad for their one-off match against South Africa. She made her Test debut on 27 June 2022, for England against South Africa. The following month, also in the series against South Africa, Lamb scored her first century in WODI cricket, with 102 runs. In November 2022, Lamb was awarded with her first England central contract.

References

External links
 
 

1997 births
Living people
England women Test cricketers
England women One Day International cricketers
England women Twenty20 International cricketers
Lancashire women cricketers
Lancashire Thunder cricketers
North West Thunder cricketers
Cricketers from Preston, Lancashire
Alumni of Edge Hill University
Manchester Originals cricketers